The Ambassador Extraordinary and Plenipotentiary of the Russian Federation to the Republic of Croatia is the official representative of the President and the Government of the Russian Federation to the President and the Government of Croatia.

The ambassador and his staff work at large in the Embassy of Russia in Zagreb.

History of diplomatic relations

Following the independence of Croatia in October 1991, and the dissolution of the Soviet Union in December 1991, the Russian Federation recognized the independence of the Republic of Croatia on 17 February 1992. Diplomatic relations between the two countries were first established on 25 May 1992, and embassies were established in the two capitals in autumn that year.

Representatives of the Russian Federation to the Republic of Croatia (1992 – present)

References

 
Croatia
Russia